The Sarvant Glacier is a glacier located on the northern slopes of the Cowlitz Chimneys in the state of Washington. There are several patches of permanent ice and snow that lie to the east and west of the glacier. The patches of ice and snow to the west are labeled Sarvant Glaciers.

See also
List of glaciers

References

Glaciers of Mount Rainier
Mount Rainier National Park
Glaciers of Pierce County, Washington
Glaciers of Washington (state)